Al Aoula ( or 'The First'); formerly called RTM (lit. 'Moroccan Television'), is the first Moroccan public television channel. It is a part of the state-owned SNRT Group along with Arryadia, Athaqafia, Al Maghribia, Assadissa, Aflam TV, Tamazight TV and Laayoune TV. The network broadcasts programming in Arabic, Berber, French and Spanish. Its headquarters are situated in Rabat.

Launched in 1962, Al Aoula was the first television network to produce and transmit its own programmes in the country. In 1972 it began colour broadcasts. It initially had a monopoly on television audience, until 2M gradually gained its own popularity and the creation of private channels was allowed in 1993. Despite the broadening of television offerings, Al Aoula remains popular amongst locals.

See also 
 2M
 Arryadia
 Athaqafia
 Al Maghribia
 Assadissa
 Aflam TV
 Tamazight TV
 Laayoune TV

References

External links

Société Nationale de Radiodiffusion et de Télévision
1962 establishments in Morocco
Television channels and stations established in 1962
Arabic-language television stations
French-language television stations
Television stations in Morocco
Mass media in Rabat